|}

This is a list of results for the Legislative Council at the 2010 South Australian state election.

Election results 

 Dr Paul Collier died on 9 March 2010. His name remained on the ballot paper, and electors who cast a vote for him had their vote redirected to their next preference.

See also
 Candidates of the 2010 South Australian state election
 Members of the South Australian Legislative Council, 2010–2014

References

2010
2010 elections in Australia
2010s in South Australia